Fanelli is a surname. Notable people with the surname include:

 Alison Fanelli (born 1979), American former actress 
 Ernest Fanelli (1860–1917), French composer 
 Francesco Fanelli (c. 1590–1653), Italian sculptor
 Gary Fanelli (born 1950), American Samoa long-distance runner
 Giuseppe Fanelli (1827–1877), Italian revolutionary anarchist
 Pier Simone Fanelli (1641–1703), Italian painter
 Sara Fanelli (born 1969), native-Italian British artist and illustrator
 Vincent Fanelli (1881–1966), American artist

See also
 Fanelli Cafe, historic New York City restaurant and bar 
 The Fanelli Boys, TV sitcom in the USA

Italian-language surnames